The 1970 Guards European Formula 5000 Championship was a motor racing competition for Formula 5000 cars. The series was organized in the United Kingdom by the British Racing and Sports Car Club but also included European rounds. It was the first and only series to carry the Guards European Formula 5000 Championship name and the second of seven annual European Formula 5000 Championships to be contested between 1969 and 1975. The title was won by Peter Gethin, driving a McLaren M10B.

Calendar

The championship was contested over twenty rounds with each round staged over two heats.

Points system
Championship points were awarded on a 9-6-4-3-2-1 basis for the first six places at each round. Final championship positions were determined from the best ten results from the longer rounds (i.e. those contested over greater than 100 miles) and the best four results from the shorter rounds.

Championship standings

References

European Formula 5000 Championship seasons
Guards